Fortín Rock is a conspicuous rock or sea stack lying off Black Point, Livingston Island, in the South Shetland Islands. The name appears in a 1953 volume of Argentine sailing directions for Antarctica and Argentine charts. In Spanish, "fortín" means small fort. This feature has sometimes been misidentified on charts as Scarborough Castle.

References 

Rock formations of Antarctica